Adonis is an unincorporated community in northern Polk County, in the U.S. state of Missouri.

Adonis is on the southern shore of Pomme de Terre Lake.

History
A post office called Adonis was established in 1895, and remained in operation until 1935. The community has the name of Adonis, a Greek god.

In 1925, Adonis had 25 inhabitants.

References

Unincorporated communities in Polk County, Missouri
Unincorporated communities in Missouri